So Long, Marianne is a compilation album by Leonard Cohen, issued in 1989 and in 1995. It features songs from his first four albums, already covered by his 1975 best of album. Although not authorized by the artist, the album is nevertheless an official release, as Cohen's label issued it. The CD was available in several countries with different art covers and in different cheap CD series (Pop Shop in Germany, Collectors Choice in the UK, Memory Pop Shop in the Netherlands, Redhot in the UK), and also as audio cassette with four extra songs.

Track listing
All songs written by Leonard Cohen except as noted.

"Who by Fire" – 2:30
"So Long, Marianne" – 5:37
"Chelsea Hotel #2" (Cohen, Ron Cornelius) – 3:04
"Lady Midnight" – 2:55
"Sisters of Mercy" – 3:34
"Bird on the Wire" – 3:24
"Suzanne" – 3:46
"Lover Lover Lover" – 3:19
"Winter Lady" – 2:15
"Tonight Will Be Fine" – 3:47
"The Partisan" (A. Marly, H. Zaret) – 3:23
"Diamonds in the Mine" – 3:48

Certifications

References

External links
 CD Compilations of Leonard Cohen 

Leonard Cohen compilation albums
1989 compilation albums
Columbia Records compilation albums